Lagoa do Caiado is the largest lake on Pico Island, Azores. The high-altitude lake is located on the Achada Plateau, an extensive volcanic mountain range covering most of the central area of the island. The waters are clear and are used for public supply since 1993.

Unlike the rest of the Azores, which have been subject to introduction of exotic species, most of the plant-life around the lake is endemic to the archipelago (Juniperus brevifolia, Picconia azorica, Erica azorica, Vaccinium cylindraceum). It is one of the best spots for birdwatching in the island, most commonly found are the Eurasian woodcock, the common snipe, the Eurasian teal, the grey heron, the wagtails and the Azores chaffinch.

The lake is located within the Partial Natural Forest Reserve of Lagoa do Caiado; the Special Conservation Zone of Mount Pico, Prainha and Caveiro; the Special Protection Zone of the Central Zone of Pico; and the Geopark of the Achada Plateu.

Climate

References

Caiado
Bodies of water of the Azores